Phyllonorycter dombeyae is a moth of the family Gracillariidae. It is found in eastern South Africa in savannah intermixed with bushes and lower trees.

The length of the forewings is 2.28–2.48 mm. The forewings are light ochreous with white markings. The hindwings are pale grey with slight ochreous shading and with a long fringe which is concolorous with the hindwings. Adults are on wing in August.

The larvae feed as leaf miners on Dombeya rotundifolia.  The mine has the form of a moderate tentiform mine which is about 10–15 mm long. The mine is made on the underside of the leaf.

Etymology
The specific epithet is derived from the generic name of the host plant, Dombeya.

References

Endemic moths of South Africa
Moths described in 2012
dombeyae
Moths of Africa

Leaf miners
Taxa named by Jurate de Prins